Matthew Taylor Mellon II (January 28, 1964 – April 16, 2018) was an American businessman who was a chairman of the New York Republican State Committee's finance committee. He was a member of the prominent Mellon family.

Early life and relatives
Born in New York City to Karl Negley Mellon and Anne Stokes Bright, Mellon was raised in Manhattan, Palm Beach, Florida, and Northeast Harbor, Maine. He attended The Phelps School, a boys' boarding school in Malvern, Pennsylvania, followed by college at the Wharton School of the University of Pennsylvania, where he studied management. Mellon's father abandoned the family when he was five years old, before dying by suicide in 1983.

Mellon was a direct male-line descendant of Judge Thomas Mellon, founder of the Mellon Bank (now part of The Bank of New York Mellon Corporation). Mellon was named after his paternal grandfather, Matthew Taylor Mellon, who was the elder son of businessman William Larimer Mellon Sr. On his maternal side, Mellon was a direct descendant of Anthony Joseph Drexel, a banker whose investment firm was a precursor to Drexel Burnham Lambert.

Mellon maintained associations with Drexel University and Carnegie Mellon University, both of which were founded by family members. He was also involved with the National Gallery of Art, the core of whose collection was donated to the nation by his great-uncle, Andrew Mellon. In the 1990s, he worked on developing a documentary on the life of philanthropist and saint Katherine Drexel. ￼ Katharine Drexel - Wikipedia

Career

Mellon was named Finance Chairman by State Chairman Ed Cox in May 2011. In February 2018, Forbes magazine reported that Mellon's $2 million investment in the cryptocurrency XRP turned into a $1 billion fortune.

Personal life and death
Mellon had bipolar disorder, as did his father. Before their 2016 divorce, Mellon lived in New York City with his wife Nicole Hanley and their two children. He also had a daughter whom he raised jointly with his former wife, Tamara Mellon, the co-founder of shoe company Jimmy Choo. Prior to his marriage to Hanley, he was engaged to entrepreneur Noelle Reno, with whom he established a cashmere knitwear line. 

Mellon's reported addiction to the prescription opioid OxyContin was said to be costing him $100,000 a month. He was quoted as saying "OxyContin is like legal heroin. And it needs to be addressed."

At the end of 2017, Mellon moved from New York to Los Angeles, renting a house in the Hollywood Hills for $150,000 a month. There, he led an active social life and began to spend much time with Kick Kennedy, the daughter of Robert F. Kennedy, Jr. In late March 2018, Mellon dined with President Donald Trump.

Mellon died in April 2018 in Cancun, Mexico, where he was planning to check into the Clear Sky Recovery clinic, which specializes in ibogaine therapy, a medication with psychedelic properties. However, he was reported to have died in a hotel room in Cancun before arrival at the clinic, suffering a fatal heart attack after taking ayahuasca, a hallucinogenic drink.

References

1964 births
2018 deaths
Mellon family
Drexel University people
New York (state) Republicans
University of Pennsylvania alumni
Businesspeople from New York City
People from Northeast Harbor, Maine
People from Palm Beach, Florida
American people of Scotch-Irish descent
20th-century American businesspeople
American billionaires